Chintalapudi mandal is one of the 28 mandals in Eluru district of the Indian state of Andhra Pradesh. It is administered under Nuzvidu revenue division and its headquarters are located at Chintalapudi. The mandal is bounded by T.Narasapuram mandal, Lingapalem mandal, Khammam district

Towns and villages 

 census, the mandal has 35 settlements. Chintalapudi is the most populated and Gonnepalle is the least populated village in the mandal.

The settlements in the mandal are listed below:

See also 
Eluru district

References

Mandals in Eluru district